Saint-Pierre-de-Mésage is a commune in the Isère department in southeastern France.

Saint-Pierre-de-Mésage is located next to the mountain of Connex and between the Vercors and Taillefer. Near Vizille and Grenoble.

In 1946 an accident along the Rampe de Laffrey killed 18 near here.

Population

See also
Communes of the Isère department

References

Communes of Isère
Isère communes articles needing translation from French Wikipedia